Bayerotrochus philpoppei is a species of sea snail, a marine gastropod mollusc in the family Pleurotomariidae.

Description
The length of the shell reaches 56 mm.

Distribution
This marine species occurs off the Philippines.

References

External links
 

Pleurotomariidae
Gastropods described in 2006